There have been twelve baronetcies created for people with the surname Scott, one in the Baronetage of England, two in the Baronetage of Nova Scotia, and nine in the Baronetage of the United Kingdom.

History 

 The Scott Baronetcy, of Kew Green in the County of Middlesex, was created in the Baronetage of England on 9 August 1653 for William Scott. The title became either extinct or dormant on the death of the fourth Baronet in circa 1775.
 The Scott Baronetcy, of Thirlestane in the County of Selkirk, was created in the Baronetage of Nova Scotia on 22 August 1666 for Francis Scott. The third Baronet had already succeeded his grandmother as Lord Napier when he inherited the baronetcy in 1725. The baronetcy has remained a subsidiary title of the Lords Napier ever since, currently (2018) held by Francis Napier, 15th Lord Napier.
 The Scott Baronetcy, of Ancrum in the County of Roxburgh, was created in the Baronetage of Nova Scotia on 27 October 1671 for John Scott. The title became extinct on the death of the seventh Baronet in 1902.
 The Scott Baronetcy, of Great Barr in the County of Stafford, was created in the Baronetage of the United Kingdom on 30 April 1806 for Joseph Scott of Great Barr Hall, Member of Parliament for Worcester The third Baronet had already succeeded to the Bateman Baronetcy of Hartington Hall when he inherited the Baronetcy in 1851. However, the two titles separated on the death of the sixth Baronet in 1905, when the Bateman Baronetcy was inherited by the fourth Fuller-Acland-Hood baronets of St Audries. The current status of the title is uncertain. See also Scott baronets of Great Barr
 The Sibbald, later Scott Baronetcy, of Dunninald in the County of Forfar, was created in the Baronetage of the United Kingdom on 13 December 1806 for James Sibbald. The title became extinct on the death of the fifth Baronet in 1945.
 The Scott Baronetcy, of Abbotsford in the County of Roxburgh, was created in the Baronetage of the United Kingdom on 22 April 1820 for the author Walter Scott. The title became extinct on the death of the second Baronet in 1847. See also Constable Maxwell-Scott baronets.
 The Scott Baronetcy, of Lytchet Minster in the County of Dorset, was created in the Baronetage of the United Kingdom on 8 September 1821 for Claude Scott. The title became extinct on the death of the seventh Baronet in 1961.
 
 The Scott Baronetcy, of Connaught Place in the County of London, was created in the Baronetage of the United Kingdom on 23 February 1899 for John Edward Arthur Murray Scott (1847–1912), the eldest son of Dr. John Scott, a physician at Boulogne-sur-Seine, France. The title became extinct on his death in 1912. He spent much of his life in France and became the private secretary of the art collector Sir Richard Wallace, 1st Baronet (d.1890), whose widow bequeathed to Scott much of his huge fortune and art collection, part of which she donated to the nation as the Wallace Collection, supposedly on Scott's advice. He inherited the lease of Hertford House, Wallace's London townhouse, which he sold to the government as a home for the Wallace Collection, and was awarded a baronetcy for his services in  connection with the establishment of the Wallace Collection which opened as a museum in 1900. He also inherited the Château de Bagatelle in Paris, with its 60 acre garden, which he sold to the City of Paris in 1904/5, and Wallace's estates in Lisburn, Ulster and the house at 2 rue Laffitte, Paris, with its valuable art collection ("A vast apartment ... a treasure-house which brought visitors from every part of Europe"). He served as chairman of the trustees of the Wallace Collection and as a trustee of the National Gallery. He died of a heart attack whilst attending a meeting at Hertford House, unmarried and without issue, and bequeathed to his mistress Victoria Sackville-West (Baroness Sackville) much of his property together with the sum of £150,000. She sold the art collection in the rue Laffitte apartment to the Paris art dealer Jacques Seligmann for £270,000. It was believed by Scott's relatives that Victoria had exerted undue influence over him, and they challenged the will in court "in a blaze of publicity", but were unsuccessful. Jane Allen (2008) believes that "Lady Wallace had left her fortune to John Murray Scott simply because the family had become supportive friends. 'I don't attribute any evil motives to the Scotts; I don't think they were gold-diggers in the way that Victoria Sackville was'"
 The Scott Baronetcy, of Beauclerc in the County of Northumberland, was created in the Baronetage of the United Kingdom on 27 July 1907 for the businessman Walter Scott.
 The Scott Baronetcy, of the Yews in the County of Westmorland, was created in the Baronetage of the United Kingdom on 27 July 1909 for the businessman James William Scott.  His grandson Sir Oliver Scott, 3rd baronet, was a Cambridge MD who worked as a Radiobiologist in cancer therapy research.
 The Scott Baronetcy, of Witley in the County of Surrey, was created in the Baronetage of the United Kingdom on 3 February 1913 for the naval commander Admiral Percy Scott.
 The Scott Baronetcy, of Rotherfield Park in the County of Southampton, was created in the Baronetage of the United Kingdom on 16 February 1962 for Jervoise Bolitho Scott. He was for many years a member of the Hampshire County Council. His son, the second Baronet, served as Lord Lieutenant of Hampshire from 1982 to 1993.

Scott baronets, of Kew Green (1653)
Sir William Scott, 1st Baronet (died 1681)
Sir William Scott, 2nd Baronet (died )
Sir William Scott, 3rd Baronet (died 1723)
Sir William Scott, 4th Baronet (died )

Scott baronets, of Thirlestane (1666)
see the Lord Napier

Scott baronets, of Ancrum (1671)
Sir John Scott, 1st Baronet of Ancrum (died 1712)
Sir Patrick Scott, 2nd Baronet (died 1734)
Sir John Scott, 3rd Baronet (died 1746)
Sir William Scott, 4th Baronet (died 1769)
Sir John Scott, 5th Baronet (died 1812)
Sir William Scott, 6th Baronet (1803–1871)
Sir William Monteath Scott, 7th Baronet (1829–1902)

Scott baronets, of Great Barr (1806)

See Scott baronets of Great Barr

Sibbald, later Scott baronets, of Dunninald (1806)
Sir James Sibbald, 1st Baronet (died 1819)
Sir David Scott Scott, 2nd Baronet (1782–1851)
Sir James Sibbald David Scott, 3rd Baronet (1814–1885)
Sir Francis David Sibbald Scott, 4th Baronet (1851–1906)
Sir Francis Montagu Sibbald Scott, 5th Baronet (1885–1945)

Scott baronets, of Abbotsford (1820)
Sir Walter Scott, 1st Baronet (1771–1832)
Sir Walter Scott, 2nd Baronet (1801–1847)

Scott baronets, of Lytchet Minster (1821)
Sir Claude Scott, 1st Baronet (1742–1830)
Sir Samuel Scott, 2nd Baronet (1772–1849) Member of Parliament for Malmesbury 1802–1806, and Camelford 1812–1818
Sir Claude Edward Scott, 3rd Baronet (1804–1874)
Sir Claude Edward Scott, 4th Baronet (1840–1880)
Sir Edward Henry Scott, 5th Baronet (1842–1883)
Sir Samuel Edward Scott, 6th Baronet (1873–1943)
Sir Robert Claude Scott, 7th Baronet (1886–1961)

Scott baronets, of Connaught Place (1899)
Sir John Edward Arthur Murray Scott, 1st Baronet of Connaught Place (1847–1912)

Scott baronets, of Beauclerc (1907)
Sir Walter Scott, 1st Baronet (1826–1910)
Sir John Scott, 2nd Baronet (1854–1922)
Sir Walter Scott, 3rd Baronet (1895–1967)
Sir Walter Scott, 4th Baronet (1918–1992)
Sir Walter John Scott, 5th Baronet (born 1948)

Scott baronets, of the Yews (1909)
Sir James William Scott, 1st Baronet (1844–1913)
Sir Samuel Haslam Scott, 2nd Baronet (1875–1960)
Sir Oliver Christopher Anderson Scott, 3rd Baronet (1922–2016)
Sir Christopher James Anderson Scott, 4th Baronet (born 1955)

The heir apparent is the present holder's son Edward James Saim Scott (born 1990)

Scott baronets, of Witley (1913)
Sir Percy Scott, 1st Baronet (1853–1924)
Sir Douglas Winchester Scott, 2nd Baronet (1907–1984)
Sir Anthony Percy Scott, 3rd Baronet (1937–2019)
Sir Henry Douglas Edward Scott, 4th Baronet (born 1964)

Scott baronets, of Rotherfield Park (1962)
Sir Jervoise Bolitho Scott, 1st Baronet (1892–1965)
Sir James Walter Scott, 2nd Baronet (1924–1993)
Sir James Jervoise Scott, 3rd Baronet (born 1952)
The heir apparent is the present holder's son Arthur Jervoise Trafford Scott (born 1984)

The heir apparent's heir apparent is the former's eldest son Wilfred Jervoise Scott (born 2014)

References

Baronetcies in the Baronetage of Nova Scotia
Baronetcies in the Baronetage of the United Kingdom
Extinct baronetcies in the Baronetage of England
Extinct baronetcies in the Baronetage of Nova Scotia
Extinct baronetcies in the Baronetage of the United Kingdom
Scott family of Abbotsford